Senusret I (Middle Egyptian: z-n-wsrt; /suʀ nij ˈwas.ɾiʔ/) also anglicized as Sesostris I and Senwosret I, was the second pharaoh of the Twelfth Dynasty of Egypt. He ruled from 1971 BC to 1926 BC (1920 BC to 1875 BC), and was one of the most powerful kings of this Dynasty. He was the son of Amenemhat I. Senusret I was known by his prenomen, Kheperkare, which means "the Ka of Re is created." He expanded Egypt that allowed him to rule over an age of prosperity.

He continued his father's aggressive expansionist policies against Nubia by initiating two expeditions into this region in his 10th and 18th years and established Egypt's formal southern border near the second cataract where he placed a garrison and a victory stele. He also organized an expedition to a Western Desert oasis. Senusret I established diplomatic relations with some rulers of towns in Syria and Canaan. He also tried to centralize the country's political structure by supporting nomarchs who were loyal to him. His pyramid was constructed at el-Lisht. Senusret I is mentioned in the Story of Sinuhe where he is reported to have rushed back to the royal palace in Memphis from a military campaign in Libya after hearing about the assassination of his father, Amenemhat I.

Family 

The family relations of the king are well known. Senusret I was the son of Amenemhat I. His mother was a queen with the name Neferitatenen. His main wife was Neferu III who was also his sister and mother of his successor Amenemhat II. The known children are Amenemhat II and the princesses Itakayt and Sebat. The latter was most likely a daughter of Neferu III as she appears with the latter together in one inscription. Later in life his father was killed.

Events 
In his 18th year of reign Senusret I launched a military campaign against Lower Nubia and conquered the region down to the Second Cataract. The date of the expedition is mentioned on a stela from Buhen. The military campaign is mentioned in several inscriptions of this king's reign. Several local officials were involved with the military expedition. Amenemhat, governor of the Oryx nome went there with the title overseer of troops. In year 25 Egypt was devastated by a famine caused by a low Nile food.

Building program
Senusret I dispatched several quarrying expeditions to the Sinai and Wadi Hammamat and built numerous shrines and temples throughout Egypt and Nubia during his long reign. He rebuilt the important temple of Re-Atum in Heliopolis which was the centre of the sun cult. He erected 2 red granite obelisks there to celebrate his Year 30 Heb Sed Jubilee. One of the obelisks still remains and is the oldest standing obelisk in Egypt. It is now in the Al-Masalla (Obelisk in Arabic) area of Al-Matariyyah district near the Ain Shams district (Heliopolis). It is 67 feet tall and weighs 120 tons or 240,000 pounds.

Senusret I is attested to be the builder of a number of major temples in Ancient Egypt, including the temple of Min at Koptos, the Temple of Satet on Elephantine, the Montu-temple at Armant and the Montu-temple at El-Tod, where a long inscription of the king is preserved.

A shrine (known as the White Chapel or Jubilee Chapel) with fine, high quality reliefs of Senusret I, was built at Karnak to commemorate his Year 30 jubilee. It has subsequently been successfully reconstructed from various stone blocks discovered by Henri Chevrier in 1926. Finally, Senusret remodelled the Temple of Khenti-Amentiu Osiris at Abydos, among his other major building projects.

The royal court 
Some of the key members of the court of Senusret I are known. The vizier at the beginning of his reign was Intefiqer, who is known from many inscriptions and from his tomb next to the pyramid of Amenemhat I. He seems to have held this office for a long period of time and was followed by a vizier named Senusret. Two treasurers are known from the reign of the king: Sobekhotep (year 22) and Mentuhotep. The latter had a huge tomb next to the pyramid of the king and he seems to have been the main architect of the Amun temple at Karnak. Several high stewards are attested. Hor is known from several stelae and from an inscription in the Wadi el-Hudi where he was evidently the leader of an expedition for amethyst. One of the stelae is dated to year nine of the king. A certain Nakhr followed in office attested around year 12 of the king. He had a tomb at Lisht. A certain Antef, son of a woman called Zatamun is known again from several stelae, one dates to year 24 another one to year 25 of Senusret I. Another Antef was the son of a woman called Zatuser and was most likely also high steward in the king's reign.

Succession 
Senusret was crowned coregent with his father, Amenemhat I, in his father's 20th regnal year. Towards the end of his own life, he appointed his son Amenemhat II as his coregent. The stele of Wepwawetō is dated to the 44th year of Senusret and to the 2nd year of Amenemhet, thus he would have appointed him some time in his 43rd year.   Senusret is thought to have died during his 46th year on the throne since the Turin Canon ascribes him a reign of 45 Years.

See also
Loyalist Teaching

References

External links
Senusret (I) Kheperkare
Sesostris I (Kheperkare)

 
Pharaohs of the Twelfth Dynasty of Egypt
20th-century BC Pharaohs
Year of birth unknown
20th-century BC deaths